Fentrice DeNell Driskell (born March 3, 1979) is an American attorney and politician who is the Representative in the Florida House of Representatives from the 67th House district in Hillsborough County. She is Of Counsel at the law firm of Carlton Fields. She is the minority leader in the Florida House of Representatives.

Early life and education 
Driskell was born in Winter Haven, Florida, to African-American parents. Driskell was awarded her bachelor of arts degree by Harvard University and her Juris Doctor degree by Georgetown University.  After law school Driskell clerked for the Honorable Anne C. Conway of the U.S. District Court for the Middle District of Florida. Fentrice also interned for the Honorable Andrew J. Peck of the U.S. District Court for the Southern District of New York.

Political career

Election 
Driskell was elected in the general election on November 6, 2018, winning 53 percent of the vote over 47 percent for incumbent Republican candidate Shawn Harrison.

House Democratic Policy Chair 
Driskell served as the Florida House Democratic Policy Chair for the 2020–2022 term.

House Democratic Caucus Leader 
Driskell was unanimously elected as Leader of the Florida House Democratic Caucus for the 2024–2026 term. She will be the first Black woman to serve in that role.

Political positions 
In April 2022, Driskell argued that the bill to repeal the Reedy Creek Improvement Act would impose tax burdens on Orange and Osceola counties in the "billions of dollars".

On April 21, 2022, Driskell attempted to stage a sit-in demonstration to prevent a vote on proposed changes to the Florida congressional district maps that included dismantling of her district. Opponents of the tactic compared the demonstration to an insurrection. The attempted demonstration was unsuccessful in preventing the proposed redistriting.

References 

1979 births
21st-century American politicians
21st-century American women politicians
Democratic Party members of the Florida House of Representatives
Georgetown University Law Center alumni
Harvard College alumni
Living people
Women state legislators in Florida